James George may refer to:

 James Z. George (1826–1897), American military officer, lawyer, writer, and politician
 James George (academic) (1801–1870), acting Principal of Queen's University, 1853–1857
 James George (diplomat) (1918–2020), Canadian ambassador to the United Arab Emirates
 James George (weightlifter), American weightlifter

See also
 Jim George (disambiguation)
 Jimmy George (disambiguation)
 Jamie George (born 1990), English rugby union player
 George James (disambiguation)